Princess Sophie of Hohenberg (Sophie Marie Franziska Antonia Ignatia Alberta von Hohenberg;  – ) was the only daughter of Archduke Franz Ferdinand of Austria and his wife Sophie, Duchess of Hohenberg, both of whom were assassinated at Sarajevo on 28 June 1914. Their assassination triggered the First World War, thus Sophie and her two brothers are sometimes described as the first orphans of the First World War.

Early life

Princess Sophie was born on 24 July 1901 at Konopiště chateau, in Austria-Hungary (now the Czech Republic), fifty kilometres south-east of Prague. This chateau, situated in Bohemia, was the favourite home of the Archduke and his wife. On 29 September 1902, the couple's first son, Maximilian, was born. A second son, Ernst, followed on 17 May 1904. In 1908, the Archduke's wife became pregnant again, but the fourth child, a boy, was stillborn on 7 November 1908.

Since the Archduke had sworn an oath that any children he had with his morganatic wife could never succeed to the throne, he envisaged a future for them that would be normal and tranquil. He wanted his sons to lead the uncomplicated life of a country squire, while he intended that his daughter, Sophie, would be happy at the side of a socially-suitable partner whom she loved. He hoped that his children would grow up to be private individuals who could enjoy life without material worries, while leading lives of anonymity. Sophie later said that she and her brothers were brought up to know they were nothing special. She stated that her father had been firm with his children, but never harsh or unjust.

After assassination

After the assassination of her parents, Sophie and her two surviving brothers, Maximilian and Ernst, were taken in by their mother's brother-in-law and their father's close friend and shooting partner, Prince Jaroslav von Thun und Hohenstein.

In late 1918, their properties in Czechoslovakia, including Konopiště and Chlumec nad Cidlinou, were confiscated by the Czechoslovak government. The children moved to Vienna and Schloß Artstetten.

Marriage and issue

On 8 September 1920, Sophie married Count Friedrich von Nostitz-Rieneck (1 November 1893 in Prague – 29 December 1973 in Graz), son of Count Erwein Felix von Nostitz-Rieneck and Countess Amalia Podstatzky-Lichtenstein, in Tetschen. They had four children:
Count Erwein von Nostitz-Rieneck (29 June 1921 in Heinrichsgrün – 11 September 1949 in Vysokaye), died in a Soviet POW camp.
Count Franz von Nostitz-Rieneck (2 February 1923 in Vienna – 23 February 1945 in Berent), killed on the Eastern Front.
Count Aloys von Nostitz-Rieneck (12 August 1925 in Vienna – 22 April 2003 in Salzburg) married Countess Theresia von Waldburg zu Zeil und Trauchburg (born 8 August 1931 in Leutkirch im Allgäu), daughter of Erich, Prince of Waldburg-Zeil and Trauchburg, and Princess Monika of Löwenstein-Wertheim-Rosenberg. They have four children.
Countess Sophie von Nostitz-Rieneck (born 4 June 1929 in Vienna), married Baron Ernst von Gudenus (26 March 1916 in Madrid – 7 December 1972 in Weiz), son of Baron Erwein von Gudenus and Baroness Sidonia von Morsey gennant Picard. They have four children. Since 12 January 2023, she's been the last surviving grandchild of Archduke Franz Ferdinand of Austria and Sophie, Duchess of Hohenberg.

Later life
In 1938, following the Anschluss (the union of Austria and Germany under Adolf Hitler), her brothers Maximilian and Ernst were arrested by the Gestapo as a result of making anti-Nazi statements and deported to Dachau concentration camp. Their properties in Austria were confiscated by Nazi authorities. They both survived their imprisonment in Dachau.

Sophie's husband died in 1973, after which she led a quiet life in Austria, accompanied at times by her grandchildren. In 1981, she visited Konopiště for the first time in sixty years. During this visit, she talked of how happy her family life had been there.

Sophie lived to be 89 years old, dying in October 1990 at Thannhausen, Austria. She was laid to rest beside the body of her husband in the family crypt of her son-in-law, Baron Ernst Gudenus, at nearby Weizberg. She had outlived both of her younger siblings by many years.

Letter to Nedeljko Čabrinović
During the trial of the men accused of murdering Archduke Franz Ferdinand and his wife, the only defendant to express remorse was Nedeljko Čabrinović, who expressed his regrets for what he had done and apologized to the children of the victims. Princess Sophie and her brothers were told about Čabrinović's apology and wrote a letter to him. In the letter, they said they had heard about his apology and stated that his conscience could be at peace because they forgave him for his role in the murder of their parents. Sophie and Max signed the letter, but Ernst refused. The letter was delivered personally to Čabrinović in his cell at Theresienstadt, in Bohemia, by the Jesuit Father Anton Puntigam, who had given the last rites to Franz Ferdinand and his wife. On 23 January 1916, Princess Sophie and her brothers were informed that Čabrinović had died.

Fictional appearances
A fictional version of Princess Sophie, played by Danish actress Amalie Ihle Alstrup, appeared in "Vienna, November 1908", an episode of The Young Indiana Jones Chronicles later re-edited to form half of The Perils of Cupid. Young Indy falls in love with the princess and shares his first kiss with her, but is forbidden from seeing her further. Several times during the series, he is shown wearing a locket that contains her picture, which she gave to him.

Ancestry

References

Bibliography
 

1901 births
1990 deaths
20th-century Austrian women
20th-century Czech people
Austrian princesses
Bohemian nobility
Hohenberg family
Chotek family
Nostitz family
Czech people of Austrian descent
German Bohemian people
Czechoslovak refugees
Austrian people of German Bohemian descent
Austrian people of Czech descent
German people of German Bohemian descent
German people of Czech descent
German people of Austrian descent
People from Benešov